Jean Rabasse (born in 1961 in Tlemcen, French Algeria) is a French cinema set decorator and scenographer.

Biography
Jean Rabasse has long worked with the DCA Company of Philippe Decouflé for whom he created stage objects and machines. Since the start of the 1990s he has worked as a production designer in film.

Filmography

 Vortex (2021)
 Oxygen (2021)
 An Officer and a Spy (2019)
 A Faithful Man (2018)
 Climax (2018)
 Based on a True Story (2017)
 Jackie (2016)
 Two Friends (2015)
 Venus in Fur (2012)
 Me and You (2012)
 Oceans (2009)  documentary
 Paris 36 (2008)
 The Statement (2003)
 The Dreamers (2003)
 Vidocq (2001)
 Vatel (2000)
 Asterix and Obelix vs. Caesar (1999)
 The City of Lost Children (1995)
 Je m'appelle Victor (1993)

Awards
 2001 : César Award for Best Production Design for Vatel.
 2000 : Oscar nomination for best artistic direction for Vatel.
 1996 : César Award for Best Production Design for La Cité des enfants perdus.

References

French set decorators
1961 births
Living people

External links